Ahmed Ayad (born 1 January 1986 in Baghdad, Iraq) nicknamed (Iraqi Messi) is an Iraqi footballer who has represented the Iraq national football team, He plays as winger and wingback. He played with Al-Quwa Al-Jawiya in the Asian Champions League and the Arab Champions League.

Honors

Clubs
Al-Quwa Al-Jawiya
 Iraqi Premier League: 2004–05

Erbil
 Iraqi Premier League: 2011–12

Al-Shorta
 Iraqi Premier League: 2012–13

Individual 
 Iraq Super League 2007–08 MVP by voting.

References

External links

 
 
 
 Ahmed Ayad at playmakerstats.com
 Ahmed Ayad at Eurosport.com

1989 births
Living people
Iraqi footballers
Iraq international footballers
Sportspeople from Baghdad
Al-Quwa Al-Jawiya players
Erbil SC players
Expatriate footballers in Indonesia
2011 AFC Asian Cup players
Al-Shorta SC players
Association football wingers